Falkenburg or Falkinburg may refer to:

 Places
 Falkenburg, German name for Złocieniec, a town in Middle Pomerania, north-western Poland
 Falkenburg (an der Göhl), German name for Valkenburg aan de Geul, a municipality in the Dutch province of Limburg
 Falkenburg Castle, a castle in Rhineland-Palatinate, Germany
 Falkenburg, Ontario, a railway village in central Ontario, Canada
 Joseph Falkinburg House, a historic home in Dennis Township, New Jersey, US

 People
 Bob Falkenburg (1926–2022), American former tennis player and businessman of German descent
 Erik Falkenburg, Dutch footballer
 Jinx Falkenburg, Spanish-born model and actress
 Page Joseph Falkinburg Jr., birth name of American actor and retired professional wrestler Diamond Dallas Page
 Reindert Falkenburg, Dutch art historian

 Other uses
 Goodbye Falkenburg, the debut full-length album by the band Race Horses

See also
Falkenberg (disambiguation)